Sir John Hawley Glover   (24 February 1829 – 30 September 1885) was a Royal Navy officer who served as Governor of Lagos Colony, Governor of Newfoundland, and Governor of British Leeward Islands.

Naval career
He entered the service in 1841 and passed his examination as lieutenant in 1849, but did not receive a commission till May 1851.

He served on various stations, and was wounded severely in an action with the Burmese at Donabew (4 February 1853). During his years of service as lieutenant in the navy he gained considerable experience off the coast of Africa, and took part in the expedition of Dr WB Baikie up the Niger. Glover also commanded a gunboat that patrolled the Lagos Lagoon in 1861.

Governor of Lagos Colony
On 21 April 1863, he was appointed administrator of the government of Lagos Colony, and in that capacity, or as colonial secretary, he remained there till 1872. His style of governing Lagos was controversial to officials in the British Colonial office who complained about his "disregard for all rules and orders". To Lagosians, however, Glover was popular and was affectionally called Oba Globar because of his adoption of patterns rooted in local culture. He presided over many Lagosians disputes, bypassing newly instituted colonial courts. 
He shrewdly cultivated relationships with Lagosians such as Oshodi Tapa, Kosoko, and Taiwo Olowo who were previously beneficiaries of the Trans Atlantic Slave Trade and encouraged them along the path of legitimate commerce. Curiously, these were political foes of the now weakened Oba of Lagos, Dosunmu who ceded Lagos to Britain in August 1861 under the Lagos Treaty of Cession. In return, Glover's cultivated network of Lagosian loyalists provided him with intelligence and information that enabled him to govern effectively.

Establishing the forerunner of the Nigerian Army and Police 
Glover formed the nucleus of present-day Nigeria's Army and Police with 10 Hausa runaway slaves on 1 June 1863. The group was known as Glover's Hausas or 'Glover's Forty Thieves'. Glover went to great lengths to develop bonds of personal loyalty with the Armed Hausas. He personally trained, commanded, and chose his successors, ensuring their loyalty. In return for their loyalty, Glover rewarded his troops with land and dwellings. He raised their pay and provided them with smart uniforms that broadcast their status of free men and agents of the British colonial government.

After this period Glover was employed to repel incursions of the Ashantis. When the Third Anglo-Ashanti War broke out in 1873, Captain Glover undertook the task of organizing the native people, whose hatred of the Ashantis might be expected to make them favourable to the British authorities—to the extent at least to which their fears would allow them to act. His services were accepted, and in September 1873, he landed at Cape Coast in the Gold Coast and, after forming a small trustworthy force of Hausa, marched to Accra. His influence sufficed to gather a numerous native force,.

In January 1874, Captain Glover was able to render some assistance in the taking of Kumasi, but it was at the head of a Hausa force. His services were acknowledged by Parliament and by his appointment to Knight Grand Cross of the Order of St Michael and St George in the 1874 Birthday Honours.

Governor of Newfoundland, and Leeward Islands
In 1875, he was appointed governor of Newfoundland and held the post till 1881, when he was transferred to the Leeward Islands. He returned to Newfoundland in 1883 as governor again.

Death and legacy
Glover died in London on 30 September 1885. Lady Glover's Life of her husband appeared in 1897.  Lagosians raised money in 1885 to build a public hall in his memory - Glover Memorial Hall, situated on land donated by Madam Tinubu, a sometimes adversary and collaborator of Glover. There is also a memorial to him in St Paul's Cathedral in London. The unincorporated community of Glovers Harbour in Newfoundland is named after him.

See also
 Governors of Newfoundland
 List of people from Newfoundland and Labrador
 Selim Aga

References

External links
Biography at Government House The Governorship of Newfoundland and Labrador
Biography at the Dictionary of Canadian Biography Online

1829 births
1885 deaths
Royal Navy officers
British military personnel of the Third Anglo-Ashanti War
Knights Grand Cross of the Order of St Michael and St George
Governors of Newfoundland Colony
Governors of the Lagos Colony
British expatriates in Ghana
Ghanaian police officers
History of Lagos
Military history of Nigeria
Royal Navy West Africa Squadron personnel
Burials at Kensal Green Cemetery
Chief secretaries (British Empire)
People from colonial Nigeria